The Good Fight is Bizzle's second Christian hip hop album released on May 7, 2013 under Bizzle's own record label God Over Money. It was produced by Boi-1da, Dilemma, Megaman and others. It contains collaborations with No Malice, Willie 'P-Dub' Moore Jr. and Sevin.

It debuted at No. 2 on Billboard'''s Gospel Albums chart, No. 7 on Christian Albums and No. 11 on Top Rap Albums selling a total of 3,962 copies in its first week.

Critical reception

New Release Tuesday's Mark Ryan stated that it was "hip-hop evangelism at its finest" and Bizzle "touches on use of the "N" word and pimp as ways to greet one another". Ryan found it atypical of Christian hip hop artists to "be so blatant in their phrasing ... but is truly refreshing to hear someone come straight out and ask the questions."

Aubrey McKay of Wade-O Radio however described Bizzle's use of N word inappropriate on a song and continues to say that other Christian hip hop artists such as Sho Baraka suggested that the word was only used by them in respect to a certain context, either to expose it or prove a greater point. McKay highlighted "The Way", "Mr Range Rover" and "Better Way Pt. 2" as standout tracks and that The Good Fight as "a great record on several levels".

Simon Ramaker from Dutch website Christelijkerap'' highlighted the album's second single, "Dear Hip-Hop", as a song that clearly criticizes hip hop culture. Along with this, Ramaker noted "My Confession" was a "very special track" addressing Bizzle's porn addiction and sexual history.

Track listing

Bonus tracks

Charts

References

External links
 

Bizzle albums
2013 albums
Albums produced by Boi-1da